The 2019 World Rugby Pacific Nations Cup was the 14th Pacific Nations Cup, an annual international rugby union competition contested by the men's national teams of the Tier 2 rugby nations located around the Pacific: Canada, Fiji, Japan, Samoa, Tonga and the United States. Japan won their second outright Pacific Nations Cup (and their third overall, having shared the 2014 title with Samoa), winning all three of their matches with try-scoring bonus points to finish top of the standings with 15 points.

Format
The tournament used a cross-pool format. The six national teams were divided into two pools of three. Each team played three matches, one against each of the teams in the opposite pool. The tournament placings were decided on the number of points accumulated from all matches.

Standings

Fixtures
There were five fixtures played in Fiji, two in Japan, and one each in Samoa and United States. Neutral referees and television match officials were appointed for all matches.

Round 1

Notes:
 Afa Amosa, Senio Toleafoa, Alofaaga Sao, UJ Seuteni, Belgium Tuatagaloa and Johnny Vaili made their test debut for Samoa.
 James Faiva, Mali Hingano, Sam Lousi, Otumaka Mausia and Toma Taufa made their test debut for Tonga.

Notes:
 Yusuke Kizu, Lappies Labuschagné and James Moore (all Japan) and Filipo Nakosi (Fiji) made their international debut.
 This was Japan's first win over Fiji since their 24–13 win during the 2011 IRB Pacific Nations Cup.
 This was Fiji's first loss in the Pacific Nations Cup since their 18-13 defeat to Samoa in 2014.

Notes:
 Jamason Fa'anana Schultz (United States) and Peter Nelson and Andrew Quattrin (both Canada) made their international debuts.

Round 2

Notes:
 Ben Pinkelman (United States) and Henry Stowers (Samoa) made their international debuts.

Notes:
 Tevita Ratuva (Fiji) made his international debut.

Round 3

Statistics

Points scorers

Try scorers

Squads

Note: Number of caps and players' ages are indicated as of 27 July 2019 – the tournament's opening day, pre first tournament match.

Canada
On 18 July, Kingsley Jones named his 31-man squad for the Pacific Nations Cup.

On 1 August, winger Kainoa Lloyd was added to the squad as injury cover.

Fiji
On 30 May, John McKee named an initial 50-man extended squad for the upcoming Pacific Nations Cup which was cut down to 42 in June.

Japan
On 17 July, Japan named a 35-man squad for their 2019 World Rugby Pacific Nations Cup campaign.

Samoa
On 22 June, Steve Jackson named a 33-man squad for the 2019 Pacific Nations Cup.

Tonga
Tonga squad for the 2019 World Rugby Pacific Nations Cup.

United States
On the 13 June, Gary Gold named a 50-man extended squad for the Pacific Nations Cup, and in preparation ahead of the 2019 Rugby World Cup.

See also
 2019 Rugby World Cup warm-up matches

References

External links
 Pacific Nations Cup web page at World Rugby

2018
2019 rugby union tournaments for national teams
2019 in Oceanian rugby union
2019 in Fijian rugby union
2019 in Tongan rugby union
World Rugby Pacific Nations Cup
World Rugby Pacific Nations Cup
World Rugby Pacific Nations Cup
World Rugby Pacific Nations Cup
World Rugby Pacific Nations Cup